The Regional Representative Council of Indonesia is the upper house of the People's Consultative Assembly, the legislative branch of the Indonesian government. As of November 2021, there are 136 seats within the assembly, all of which consist of non-partisan members, each representing a province. The leader of the DPD is the Speaker, a position which is currently held by La Nyalla Mattalitti. In addition, the speaker is joined with three deputy speakers, namely Nono Sampono, Mahyudin, and Sultan Bachtiar Najamudin.

Members of the DPD are known as senators, and are elected in a general election once every five years. Each province of Indonesia elects 4 senators to the DPD on a non-partisan basis, as the DPD represents the interests of their provinces rather than that of the parties, although many candidates had former affiliations with political parties. The following is a full and complete list of currently serving senators in the DPD, following the 2019 Indonesian general election, consisting of 136 senators, representing 34 provinces.

Current leadership

Current senators

Sumatra

Aceh

North Sumatra

West Sumatra

Riau

Riau islands

Jambi

South Sumatra

Bangka Belitung Islands

Bengkulu

Lampung

Java

Banten

Jakarta

West Java

Central Java

Yogyakarta

East Java

Lesser Sunda Islands

Bali

West Nusa Tenggara

East Nusa Tenggara

Kalimantan

West Kalimantan

Central Kalimantan

South Kalimantan

East Kalimantan

North Kalimantan

Sulawesi

North Sulawesi

Gorontalo

Central Sulawesi

South Sulawesi

Southeast Sulawesi

West Sulawesi

Maluku

Maluku

North Maluku

Papua

West Papua

Papua

Notes and references

Notes

References 

Government of Indonesia
People's Consultative Assembly